Atticus Ronald Shaffer (born June 19, 1998) is an American actor known for playing Brick Heck on the ABC sitcom The Middle (2009–2018), as well as for voicing Edgar in the film Frankenweenie (2012) and Ono on the Disney Junior series The Lion Guard (2016–2019), and for his brief appearance in Hancock (2008).

Career

The Middle 

The role for which Shaffer is thus far most well-known is that of Brick Heck, a character in the American television sitcom The Middle. The role was played by Shaffer during the show's entire nine-season run, from 2009 to 2018. Brick is the youngest of the three Heck siblings, and is highly intelligent and smarter than most people his age. He loves to read and has an ongoing fascination with fonts. Brick is socially awkward, and repeatedly overlooked by the members of his family, such as forgotten birthdays. The series and its cast were nominated dozens of times for awards, and won over a dozen collectively.

In a Wired magazine interview published in January 2013, Shaffer said his role as Brick was very similar to his own life, as he is also a "big reader" and "nerd[s] out over the weirdest stuff". In May 2011, a TV Guide article had reported the closeness as well. Brick's characterization, including his idiosyncratic palilalian repetition of words and phrases at the end of sentences, is actually based on The Middle co-creator Eileen Heisler's son, Justin.

Personal life 
Named after Atticus Finch, the lawyer in To Kill a Mockingbird, Shaffer was born in Santa Clarita, California, to Ron and Debbie Shaffer. He lives in Acton, California.

Shaffer has type four osteogenesis imperfecta, a condition involving a defect in type 1 collagen, which causes fragile bones and short stature. He is 4' 8" (142 cm) tall.

Shaffer is a Christian and as of 2018 had a daily Bible study with his mother, alternating between the Old and the New Testaments. As of 2015, the year he was baptized, he was a fan of Contemporary Christian rock music and identified several Christian bands among his favorites.

Shaffer has official YouTube and Twitch video gaming pages, titled "AtticusShafferVlog", the latter of which he announced in December 2019. He plays The Long Dark and Call of Duty: Modern Warfare among other video games.

Filmography

Television

Film

Radio

Self

Awards and nominations

References

External links 

Atticus Shaffer Vlog on Youtube
Atticus Shaffer Vlog on Twitch

1998 births
21st-century American male actors
American Christians
American male child actors
American male film actors
American male television actors
American male voice actors
Christians from California
Living people
Male actors from Santa Clarita, California
People with osteogenesis imperfecta
21st-century Christians